Maanam (Tamil for respect or dignity) was a Polish rock band.

History
Maanam was formed by Marek Jackowski and Milo Kurtis in 1975 as guitar band M-a-M. In 1976 the band was joined by guitar player John Porter and by Kora (Olga Jackowska) - Jackowski's wife. When Kurtis left, the band changed its name to Maanam Elektryczny Prysznic (Maanam Electric Shower). Originally an acoustic outfit, the band went electric in 1980, and since then has recorded some of Poland's best-selling singles and albums over the past 25 years.

During the first half of the 1980s, Maanam featured an energetic, guitar-driven post-punk sound. Kora's vocal gymnastics were typical of the iconoclastic international female pop vocalists of the time, and showcased the consonant-laden Polish language as one perfectly suited to rock sounds. In 1988, Maanam's "Sie ściemnia" became the first Polish music video to air on the international MTV. Maanam's sound in the 1980s could be considered a cross between Nina Hagen, Siouxsie and the Banshees, and Blondie.

In the 1990s, Maanam acquired a more melodic, but equally catchy, sound.

In 2007, Marek and Olga (Kora) announced the suspension of the band for an indefinite time. The two later performed with other musicians.

Guitarist Janusz Iwański played with the group for a time.

Their former lead singer, Olga Jackowska, died from cancer on 28 July 2018 at the age of 67.

Discography

References

External links 

 Maanam discography at Discogs
 Official home page 

1976 establishments in Poland
2007 disestablishments in Poland
Polish rock music groups
Musical groups established in 1976
Musical groups disestablished in 2007